Sir William Bulmer (by 1465-1531) of Wilton Castle, Wilton, North Riding of Yorkshire was an English soldier knight and Member of Parliament.

He was the son of Sir Ralph Bulmer of Wilton and his wife Joan, the daughter of Sir William Bowes of Streatlam, county Durham. He succeeded his father in 1496 and was knighted after taking part in the Earl of Surrey’s Scottish campaign of 1497.

He was appointed sheriff and escheator for county Durham for 1503-16, 1523-7 and jointly with his son Sir John Bulmer for 1527-9. He was appointed High Sheriff of Yorkshire for 1517-18. He also served as a member of the council of 4th Earl of Shrewsbury in 1522 and as lieutenant of the Eastern March and Norham Castle, Northumberland in 1523.

In 1520 he accompanied Henry VIII with other knights to his meeting with Francis I of France at the Field of the Cloth of Gold. In 1523 he was selected as a knight of the shire for Yorkshire in the Parliament of England.

He married by 1490, Margery, the daughter of John Conyers, with whom he had three sons and a daughter. He was succeeded by Sir John, who was executed in 1537 for his part in the northern rebellion.

References

Year of birth uncertain
1531 deaths
English knights
English MPs 1523
High Sheriffs of Durham
High Sheriffs of Yorkshire